The County of Cavendish is a county (a cadastral division) in Queensland, Australia.  Like all counties in Queensland, it is a non-functional administrative unit, that is used mainly for the purpose of registering land titles.  The county includes the northern part of the Toowoomba Region and the western part of the Somerset Region. The county was officially named and bounded by the Governor in Council on 7 March 1901 under the Land Act 1897.

Parishes 
Cavendish is divided into parishes, listed as follows:

References

Cavendish

External links